Health and Efficiency is an EP by English experimental rock band This Heat. It was released in 1980 by record label Piano.

Track listing 

All music written and composed by This Heat (Charles Bullen, Charles Hayward, Gareth Williams).

Critical reception 

Pitchfork called the EP "This Heat's masterpiece".

Personnel 

 This Heat

 Charles Bullen
 Charles Hayward
 Gareth Williams

 Additional personnel

 David Cunningham – production
 Chris Blake – engineering
 Chris Gray – engineering
 Geoffrey Zipper – engineering
 Jack Balchin – engineering
 Laurie-Rae Chamberlain – engineering
 Peter Bullen – engineering
 Phil Clarke – engineering
 Pete Cobb – sleeve artwork

Charts

References

External links 

 

1980 EPs
Post-punk EPs
Experimental rock EPs
This Heat albums